Clément Sagna (4 October 1942 – 2 March 2014) was a Senegalese athlete. He competed in the men's long jump at the 1968 Summer Olympics.

References

1942 births
2014 deaths
Athletes (track and field) at the 1968 Summer Olympics
Senegalese male long jumpers
Olympic athletes of Senegal
Place of birth missing